The Persian striped skink (Eumeces persicus) is a species of skink endemic to Iran.

References

Eumeces
Reptiles described in 2017
Reptiles of Iran